The Bandyliiga ('Bandy League') is the top level of men's bandy in Finland. The league was founded in 1908 as the Jääpallon SM-sarja ('Bandy Finnish Championship Series') and the present name has been used since the 1991–92 season. Bandyliiga is organized by the Finnish Bandy Association and the current chairman is Mika Mutikainen.

The 2021–22 Bandyliiga season marked the 112th season in which the Finnish Championship was contested and comprised nine teams. Veiterä are the reigning Finnish Champions, having won the 2022 Bandyliiga playoffs.

History

The competitive side of men's bandy in Finland was organized in 1907 and the first Finnish Championship series was played in the winter of 1908. The very first title was won by Polyteknikkojen Urheiluseura, who beat IFK Helsingfors in the final match with a score of 8–3. The championship was decided as a cup competition until 1931. The league was played as single round-robin tournament with various numbers of divisions up until the 1969–70 season, when the current double round-robin format was introduced. The season was split into regular season and playoffs in the 1976–77 season.

The competition has been played every year since 1908, with the exceptions of 1918, 1940 and 1942, when the competition was cancelled first due to Finnish civil war and then due to Winter War and the Continuation war. An unofficial wartime league was played during those years.

In 2008 Bandyliiga celebrated its 100th anniversary with a grand final match of the season, when Oulun Luistinseura beat Tornion Palloveikot in a penalty shoot-out and claimed the Finnish championship.

The 2014–15 season of Bandyliiga ended with Mikkelin Kampparit taking their second championship title. Kampparit beat HIFK 6–3 in the final, played in HIFK's homeground Kallio Ice Rink. The 2016–17 season ended with Veiterä taking their fifth championship title (first since 1980). Veiterä beat Akilles 3–5 in the final, played in Akilles' homeground in Porvoo.

Teams

2021–22 season 

Source:

Recent champions

See also
 List of Finnish Bandy clubs

References
Content in this article was translated from the existing Finnish Wikipedia article at :fi:Bandyliiga; see its history for attribution.

External links
 Official website (in Finnish)
Finnish Bandy Association (in Finnish)

Bandy competitions in Finland
Bandy
National bandy leagues
Sports leagues established in 1908
1908 establishments in Finland
Professional sports leagues in Finland